Dennis Coenen (born 11 November 1991 in Genk) is a Belgian cyclist, who currently rides for Belgian amateur team Acrog–Tormans.

Major results

2009
 1st Overall Sint-Martinusprijs Kontich
1st Stage 4
 6th Trofee Der Vlaamse Ardennen
 10th Omloop Het Nieuwsblad Juniors
2014
 1st Ronde van Overijssel
 1st Stadsprijs Geraardsbergen
 5th Antwerpse Havenpijl
 8th Baronie Breda Classic
 8th Ronde Pévéloise
 10th Münsterland Giro
2015
 8th Nationale Sluitingsprijs
2016
 3rd Omloop Het Nieuwsblad Beloften
2017
 10th Kernen Omloop Echt-Susteren
2018
 3rd De Kustpijl
 8th Internationale Wielertrofee Jong Maar Moedig
2019
 10th Midden–Brabant Poort Omloop

References

External links

1991 births
Living people
Belgian male cyclists
Sportspeople from Genk
Cyclists from Limburg (Belgium)
21st-century Belgian people